StraightLine HDD, formerly StraightLine Manufacturing, Inc., is an American corporation which designs and builds tooling and equipment for the Directional drilling industry. The company's products include directional drills, mud mixing systems, air hammers and a full line of down hole tools, wear parts and accessories for all brands of directional drill rigs.

Established in Wichita, Kansas on January 1, 1984 the company was called "StraightLine Manufacturing, Inc." for its first 19 years.

Today StraightLine HDD has directional drilling equipment, tools and accessories operating in the United States, Canada, the United Kingdom, Singapore, Malaysia, China, Australia, India, Poland, Ukraine and the Russian Federation.

History

1984 to 1988: The early years

StraightLine Manufacturing, Inc. is founded in Wichita, Kansas. During this time the company launches its family of rotary tools and introduces a dry bore solution.

1989 to 2002: Entering the HDD market

StraightLine entered the HDD market with the introduction of its line of DirectLine drills in 1989.

2003 to Present: Acquisition by Finco Inc.

StraightLine was acquired by privately held Finco Inc. d/b/a Source: HDD in 2003. Finco Inc. rebranded the company as StraightLine HDD and relocated the company to a new . manufacturing plant in Hutchinson, Kansas.

Patents

StraightLine HDD has been awarded four US Patents:

 US Patent 5231899 for a drilling rig breakout wrench system on August 3, 1993.
 US Patent 5253721 for a directional boring head on October 19, 1993.
 US Patent 5709276 for a multi-position directional drill on January 20, 1998.
 US Patent 5921331 for a backreamer on July 13, 1999.

External links

StraightLine HDD
Finco Inc.
Underground Construction Magazine

References

Construction industry of the United States
Manufacturing companies based in Kansas
Manufacturing companies established in 1984
Hutchinson, Kansas
Reno County, Kansas